Saint-Symphorien-d'Ozon is a commune in the Rhône department, within the urban area of Lyon, in eastern France.

Population

See also
Communes of the Rhône department

References

Communes of Rhône (department)